Our Lady of Lourdes Catholic Church is a Catholic Church in Atlanta, Georgia, United States. Located in the Sweet Auburn neighborhood, the church was established as a mission in 1912 and is a contributing property of the Martin Luther King Jr. National Historical Park.

History 
The church was established in November 1912 by Ignatius Lissner of the Society of African Missions with funding from Katharine Drexel, who had founded the Sisters of the Blessed Sacrament (SBS). The church was located in Sweet Auburn, an African American neighborhood in Atlanta, and shared a high degree of ecumenism with several Protestant churches in the neighborhood. The church, originally known as Our Lady of Lourdes Colored Mission, was built as a three-story combination church and school, and Lissner served as its first priest. At the time, it was the second Catholic mission intended to serve African Americans in Georgia and the first in Atlanta. The church is located on the same block as the birthplace of Martin Luther King Jr., who as a child would often play on the parish grounds. During the civil rights movement, many church members protested for increased civil rights. The school would remain active until 2001, when it closed due to a lack of funding from the Roman Catholic Archdiocese of Atlanta.

See also 
 List of Roman Catholic churches in the Archdiocese of Atlanta

References

Bibliography

External links 
 
 

1912 establishments in Georgia (U.S. state)
Christian organizations established in 1912
Martin Luther King Jr. National Historic Site and Preservation District
Roman Catholic Archdiocese of Atlanta
Roman Catholic churches in Georgia (U.S. state)
African-American Roman Catholic churches
Society of African Missions